U.S. Route 41 Alternate (US 41 Alt.), also signed U.S. Route 41A in Tennessee (US 41A), connects the town of Monteagle, Tennessee, with Hopkinsville, Kentucky, 10 miles (16 km) north of the Tennessee line. It serves the city of Clarksville, Tennessee, on its way to Nashville, where it briefly runs concurrently with US 41. It then separates again to serve Shelbyville, Winchester, and Tullahoma before rejoining the main route atop Monteagle Mountain. US 41A runs west of US 41 for its entire length, aside from one mile in downtown Nashville where they are concurrent.

Route description 
U.S. 41A begins in Monteagle, and runs along the Marion-Grundy County line on its way to the Interstate 24 Exit 134 interchange. US 41A follows a westward path into Franklin County, connecting I-24 to Sewanee, Cowan, and Winchester. At Winchester, US 41A turns northwestward, bypassing Tims Ford Lake, Woods Reservoir, and Arnold Engineering Development Center before entering Coffee County and the city of Tullahoma. It has a brief concurrency with SR 55 before continuing northwest. US 41A then traverses northeastern Moore County before entering Bedford County.

From Shelbyville, US 41A continues northwest into the southwestern portion of Rutherford County. Further north, it then enters eastern Williamson County, where it begins a concurrency with US 31A that lasts from just south of Triune near the I-840 Exit 42 interchange, through Nolensville, and into Davidson County and the Metro Nashville area.

In downtown Nashville, US 31A ends, while US 41A continues and begins a brief concurrency with US 31, US 41, US 431, and SR 6 on Eighth Avenue. US 41A leaves the concurrency off James Robertson Parkway near the Nashville Farmer's Market, but then begins a concurrency with unsigned SR 12. US 41A/SR 12 follows Rosa L. Parks Boulevard through the Exit 85 interchange of I-65. After crossing the Cumberland River via the Hydes Ferry Bridge, SR 12 leaves the concurrency in the Bordeaux neighborhood. US 41A's continuation after that marks the eastern terminus of SR 112 as US 41A continues north, and then west-northwest into Cheatham and Robertson Counties, following the boundary between the two counties, and crossing it four times, intersecting SR 49 at Pleasant View before the third and fourth times. 
After crossing the Robertson-Cheatham County line for the final time, US 41A then enters Montgomery County and the city of Clarksville. After the first junction with US 41A Bypass and SR 76, it expands into four lanes. It goes right through the downtown core before crossing the Red River. SR 12, once again as a hidden route, rejoins US 41A at the US 41A Bypass/US 79/SR 76 junction. US 79/SR 76 leaves the concurrency, while US 41A/SR 12 continues northward, following the eastern boundary of the Fort Campbell Military Reservation to the Kentucky state line, where the Clarksville city limits border that of Oak Grove. The state line also marks SR 12's northern/western terminus
 
Once US 41A enters Christian County in Oak Grove, it is signed as US 41 Alternate. After crossing Interstate 24 for a final time, US 41A continues north to a junction with the Pennyrile Parkway (future I-169), and then ending with a junction with US 41/US 68/KY 80/KY 109 in downtown Hopkinsville.

History 

Prior to 1930, from Nashville to Hopkinsville, the current US 41A corridor from Nashville to Hopkinsville was originally signed as US 41, while the current US 41 was signed as US 241. In 1930, US 41 became US 41W, and US 241 (the current US 41 main alignment) was renumbered, and signed as US 41E. In 1943, the western route became US 41 Alternate, with the main US 41 moving to the east route. From the decommissioning of US 41W, the route has been signed as US 41A.

Major intersections

Bypass

Clarksville

U.S. Route 41A Bypass (US 41A Byp.) is a bypass of the city of Clarksville, Tennessee, on its south side.  It first splits off from the US 41A mainline at 2nd Street and Kraft, following Riverside Drive south, running concurrently with SR 13 and SR 12, along the Cumberland River to an intersection with SR 48 (College Street). It becomes concurrent with SR 48 and they travel south and leave town to an intersection with Cumberland Drive, where SR 13 and SR 48 split off to continue southward. The bypass then curves to the east, still following the river, and enters some neighborhoods and comes to an intersection with Ashland City Road, where SR 12 splits off and goes toward Ashland City. US 41A Byp. then continues east and comes to an end at an intersection with US 41A (Madison Street) and SR 76 (M.L.K. Jr. Bypass Parkway). Most of the road is a two-lane highway, occasionally widening to three lanes to accommodate truck traffic on hills.

See also

References

External links

41 Alternate (Monteagle, Tennessee-Hopkinsville, Kentucky)
Transportation in Grundy County
Transportation in Marion County
Transportation in Franklin County
Transportation in Coffee County
Transportation in Moore County
Transportation in Bedford County
Transportation in Rutherford County
Transportation in Williamson County
Transportation in Davidson County
Transportation in Cheatham County
Transportation in Robertson County
Transportation in Montgomery County
Transportation in Christian County
Alternate (Monteagle, Tennessee-Hopkinsville, Kentucky)
Transportation in Clarksville, Tennessee
Transportation in Nashville, Tennessee
41 Alternate (Monteagle)
41 Alternate (Hopkinsville)